Hard to Believe may refer to:

 Hard to Believe: A Kiss Covers Compilation, 1990 album
 "Hard to Believe" (David Cook song), from the 2011 album This Loud Morning
 "Hard to Believe" (Eraserheads song), from the 1997 album Sticker Happy
 "Hard to Believe", song from the 1967 album, Pisces, Aquarius, Capricorn & Jones Ltd., by The Monkees